Lapu is a village development committee in Gorkha District in the Gandaki Zone of northern-central Nepal. At the time of the 1991 Nepal census, it had a population of 1,650 and had 362 houses in the village.

References

lapu ward no9

Populated places in Gorkha District